Rissanen is a Finnish surname. Notable people with the surname include:

Taavi Rissanen (1864–1934), Finnish schoolteacher and politician
Oskari Rissanen (1893–1957), Finnish track and field athlete 
Antti Rissanen (born 1931), Finnish sport shooter
Jorma Rissanen (born 1932), information theorist
Mika Rissanen (born 1978), Finnish history researcher and author
Jaakko Rissanen, Finnish ice hockey player
Rasmus Rissanen (born 1991), Finnish ice hockey player

Finnish-language surnames